Seastalker is an interactive fiction game written by Stu Galley and Jim Lawrence and published by Infocom in 1984. It was released simultaneously for several popular computer platforms of the time, such as the Commodore 64, Apple II, and IBM PC compatibles (as a self-booting disk). The game was marketed as an introduction to interactive fiction for preteen players, having difficulty rating of "Junior." It was the only game to ever use this rating, which was replaced by the "Introductory" label given to games such as Wishbringer. It is Infocom's twelfth game.

Galley and Lawrence later wrote Moonmist for Infocom.

Plot
The player's character is a young inventor and marine scientist. A research facility called the Aquadome issues a call for help, indicating that the undersea structure is being attacked by a sea monster. With helpful assistant Tip, the player must navigate to the Aquadome in the new untested two-person submarine Scimitar and investigate the problem. But that isn't all... it looks like there may be a saboteur within the Aquadome as well.

The game has 30 locations.

Release
The package includes the following physical items:
A logbook for the Scimitar, including a letter from "The President" congratulating the player on acceptance into the Discovery Squad
Four double-sided "top secret Infocards", containing hints printed in blue ink beneath a pattern of red ink
A decoder featuring a small square of red plastic to reveal the hints on the Infocards
A nautical chart of Frobton Bay for navigation
A "Discovery Squad "badge" sticker

Reception
Computer Gaming World noted Seastalkers easiness, recommending it only as a beginner's text adventure, particularly for young kids. Exemplifying this are the numerous tips dropped by both in-game characters and the game itself, directing the player to the included Infocards. The review complained of minor inconsistencies like items that could not be interacted with until an in-game character told the player of its existence.

PC Magazine gave Seastalker 10.0 points out of 12. It also noted the game's relatively low difficulty level, praised the prose, and stated, "I enjoyed myself immensely".

References

External links 
 
 Seastalker package, documentation, and feelies
 Seastalker at Infocom-if.org

1980s interactive fiction
1984 video games
Adventure games
Amiga games
Amstrad CPC games
Apple II games
Atari 8-bit family games
Atari ST games
Classic Mac OS games
Commodore 64 games
Infocom games
TI-99/4A games
Video games developed in the United States
Single-player video games